The BTEC Foundation Diploma in Art and Design is a vocational qualification taken in England and Wales and Northern Ireland by young people aged 18 and over and by adults. The qualification is organised and awarded by the Edexcel Foundation within the BTEC brand.

Qualification overview
The BTEC Foundation Diploma in Art and Design is a vocational qualification at Level 3. It is the equivalent of 1.5 GCE A Levels.

The course is available from Edexcel and is studied at various educational establishments. The course is designed to give students a broad knowledge in a range of art and design disciplines to progress onto employment or University Degree in a related subject.

The course is assessed in 7 units of 60 hours for which a pass must be achieved and 2 units of 90 hours which determine the overall grade, this totals 600 hours. Students are graded on their understanding of the unit by either a pass, merit or distinction (highest achievable). Students who wish to progress onto a BA in Fine Art will usually need to attain merit grades or above in order to meet the entry requirements, however, this can vary depending on the college.

Level
The Foundation Diploma is regarded as equivalent in level to A Levels and grades are awarded UCAS points particular to the course.

The usual entry requirements consist of an A Level or AS Level in Art and Design along with three GCSE subject passes at grades C or better. A portfolio of work is also normally required. Equivalent entry qualifications are also commonly accepted.

Progression
Possible outcomes include:
 progression to a BA degree in Fine Art and other Arts related subjects
 progression into employment

References

Educational qualifications in the United Kingdom
Visual arts education